ActiMates are a discontinued series of interactive toys released by Microsoft Kids in September 1997. The toys are in the form of licensed dolls which can interact with many episodes of their respective television series from 1997-2000 or on special ActiMates-compatible VHS tapes and special PC games.

Microsoft released seven characters: Barney, Arthur and his sister D.W. and the Teletubbies. ActiMates Barney was the first to be released in 1997, becoming a success that holiday season. The dolls can interact with the TV and the computer (the Teletubbies can't interact with the PC) using a special TV and PC Pack. The toys were marketed as educational tools and gave positive affirmations for correct answers from the user. They can also be played standalone without VCR and computer. Three ActiMates Barney PC games released at launch, with more additional software to be released for Barney. Microsoft discontinued the dolls in 2000 and lost the patent rights to the toys not long afterward.

References

1997 software
Discontinued Microsoft products
Toy brands
Barney & Friends
Teletubbies
Arthur (TV series)